On December 21, 2020, a group of protesters demonstrated at the Oregon State Capitol against health restrictions related to the COVID-19 pandemic in Oregon. A security video released in January 2021 showed Representative Mike Nearman allowing armed protesters to enter through a side door, after which Nearman circled the building and entered from the other side. The Oregon House of Representatives voted 59–1 to expel him for his actions. He later pled guilty to first-degree official misconduct.

The protesters included members of the Proud Boys, Patriot Prayer, and supporters of QAnon. One person maced police officers, while others vandalized the building and another assaulted two journalists. At least three of the protesters present at the Oregon State Capitol later participated in the January 6 United States Capitol attack.

References

2020 in Oregon
Crimes in Oregon
December 2020 crimes in the United States
December 2020 events in the United States
History of Salem, Oregon
Protests in Oregon